Paroreodon is an extinct genus of oreodont of the family Merycoidodontidae, subfamily Merycoidodontinae, endemic to North America during the Oligocene-Miocene subepochs (30.8—20.6 mya), existing for approximately .

Taxonomy
Paroreodon was named by Thorpe (1921). Its type is Paroreodon marshi. It was synonymized subjectively with Oreodontoides by Schultz and Falkenbach in 1947 and assigned to Merycoidodontidae by Thorpe (1921) and Lander (1998).

Fossil distribution
Wheeler County, Oregon.

Species
Paroredon parvus (synonymized with Oreodontoides stocki, Paroredon marshi)

References

Oreodonts
Prehistoric mammals of North America
Oligocene even-toed ungulates
Miocene even-toed ungulates
Aquitanian genus extinctions
Oligocene genus first appearances
Prehistoric even-toed ungulate genera